A youth-led development is an initiative that is largely devised and implemented by young people.

Definition of youth

Most organizations use the UN's definition of youth which is a person between the ages of 15 to 24, but some organizations expand that definition to 30.

Youth-led Organization

A youth-led organization focuses on youth-led development, promotes youth participation and often has a permanent staff largely made up of young people.

Examples of youth-led development

Some examples of organizations that focus on youth-led development are:
UYDO (United Youth Development Organization), U8 Global Student Partnership for Development, Engineers Without Borders, Peace Child International and Restless Development.

References

External links
UYDO official homepage
U8 official homepage
EWB official homepage
Restless Development official homepage

Youth activists